The 2013 European Darts Trophy  was the second of eight PDC European Tour events on the 2013 PDC Pro Tour. The tournament took place at the Glaspalast  in Sindelfingen, Germany, from 30 March–1 April 2013. It featured a field of 64 players and £100,000 in prize money, with £20,000 going to the winner.

Wes Newton won his first European Tour title by defeating Paul Nicholson 6–5 in the final.

Prize money

Qualification
The top 32 players from the PDC ProTour Order of Merit on the 5 March 2013 automatically qualified for the event. The remaining 32 places went to players from three qualifying events - 20 from the UK Qualifier (held in Wigan on 15 March), eight from the European Qualifier and four from the Host Nation Qualifier (both held at the venue in Sindelfingen on 29 March).

Phil Taylor, Adrian Lewis, Gary Anderson and Raymond van Barneveld opted to not play in the event. James Wade withdrew the day before the tournament started due to illness, as did Simon Whitlock in order to focus on the Premier League. An additional place in the draw was therefore available in the European Qualifier and the Host Nation Qualifier.

1–32

UK Qualifier
  Kevin Dowling (first round)
  Michael Smith (second round)
  John Bowles (first round)
  Steve Hine (first round)
  Ricky Sudale (first round)
  Terry Temple (third round)
  Ross Smith (second round)
  Nick Fullwell (third round)
  Alex Roy (first round)
  Steve Maish (first round)
  James Richardson (first round)
  Gareth Pass (first round)
  Jamie Robinson (third round)
  John Part (quarter-finals)
  Mark Hylton (first round)
  John Henderson (first round)
  Connie Finnan (second round)
  Andrew Johnson (first round)
  Gaz Cousins (first round)
  Tony West (first round)

European Qualifier
  Co Stompé (first round)
  Leon de Geus (first round)
  Leo Hendriks (first round)
  Ronny Huybrechts (first round)
  Kurt van de Rijck (first round)
  Davyd Venken (first round)
  Mensur Suljović (semi-finals)
  Magnus Caris (first round)
  Dragutin Horvat (first round)

Host Nation Qualifier
  Michael Kiebel (first round)
  Tomas Seyler (first round)
  Max Hopp (second round)
  Mario Gaisbauer (first round)
  Jyhan Artut (first round)

Draw

References

2013 PDC European Tour
2013 in German sport